This is a list of songs that topped the Belgian Walloon (francophone) Ultratop 40 in 2002.

Best-selling singles 

This is the ten best-selling/performing singles in 2002

See also
2002 in music

References

2002 in Belgium
2002 record charts
2002

de:Liste der Nummer-eins-Hits in Belgien (2002)